Misiano is a surname. Notable people with the surname include:

Christopher Misiano, American television director and producer
Fortunato Misiano (1899–1976), Italian film producer
Francesco Misiano (1884-1936), Italian communist and film producer.
Vincent Misiano, American television director, brother of Christopher